The black-headed weaver (Ploceus melanocephalus), also known as yellow-backed weaver,  is a species of bird in the family Ploceidae.

Taxonomy and systematics 
P. victoriae Ash, 1986 is now thought to be a hybrid between P. melanocephalus and P. castanops.

Description 
Breeding males have a black head and yellow nuchal collar, which is absent in the Juba and golden-backed weavers. It also differs from the latter species and village weaver by its plain, greenish mantle plumage. The pale yellow underpart plumage is suffused with a variable amount of chestnut.

The female and non-breeding male lack the black head, and resemble a female masked weaver, except that they have dark eyes and a darker bill. Their buffy breast plumage also distinguishes them from non-breeding golden-backed weavers.

Distribution and habitat
It occurs in West, Central, and East Africa, but it has also been introduced to the Iberian Peninsula. It is found in savanna and similar habitats, typically near water. It often lives on an Acacia tree 3 meter away from land to prevent predation.

Gallery

References

black-headed weaver
Birds of Sub-Saharan Africa
black-headed weaver
black-headed weaver
Taxonomy articles created by Polbot